Halotalea is a gram-negative, obligate aerobic, non-spore-forming, osmotolerant, alkalitolerant and motile genus from the family of Halomonadaceae, with currently one known species; Halotalea alkalilenta.

References

Oceanospirillales
Monotypic bacteria genera
Bacteria genera
Taxa described in 2007